In the mathematical field of graph theory, the Hoffman graph is a 4-regular graph with 16 vertices and 32 edges discovered by Alan Hoffman. Published in 1963, it is cospectral to the hypercube graph Q4.

The Hoffman graph has many common properties with the hypercube Q4—both are  Hamiltonian and have chromatic number 2, chromatic index 4, girth 4 and diameter 4. It is also a 4-vertex-connected graph and a 4-edge-connected graph.  However, it is not distance-regular. It has book thickness 3 and queue number 2.

Algebraic properties
The Hoffman graph is not a vertex-transitive graph and its full automorphism group is a group of order 48 isomorphic to the direct product of the symmetric group S4 and the cyclic group Z/2Z.

The characteristic polynomial of the Hoffman graph is equal to

making it an integral graph—a graph whose spectrum consists entirely of integers. It is the same spectrum as the hypercube Q4.

Gallery

References 

Individual graphs
Regular graphs